Sukhanikha is a rural locality (a village) in Novoselskoye Rural Settlement, Kovrovsky District, Vladimir Oblast, Russia. The population was 33 as of 2010.

Geography 
Sukhanikha is located on the Klyazma River, 16 km southwest of Kovrov (the district's administrative centre) by road. Sychyovo is the nearest rural locality.

References 

Rural localities in Kovrovsky District